Christina McHale and Olivia Rogowska are the defending champions but chose not to defend their title. 
Sophie Ferguson and Sally Peers defeated Magda Linette and Liana Ungur in the final by a walkover.

Seeds

Draw

Draw

References
 Doubles Draw

Torneo Internazionale Femminile Antico Tiro a Volo - Doubles